The World Group was the highest level of Davis Cup competition in 1983.

The United States were the defending champions, but were eliminated in the first round.

Australia won the title, defeating Sweden in the final, 3–2. The final was held at the Kooyong Stadium in Melbourne, Australia, from 26 to 28 December. It was the Australian team's first Davis Cup title since 1977 and their 25th Davis Cup title overall.

Participating teams

Draw

First round

Soviet Union vs. France

Paraguay vs. Czechoslovakia

Australia vs. Great Britain

Romania vs. Chile

Sweden vs. Indonesia

New Zealand vs. Denmark

Italy vs. Ireland

Argentina vs. United States

Quarterfinals

France vs. Paraguay

Australia vs. Romania

New Zealand vs. Sweden

Italy vs. Argentina

Semifinals

Australia vs. France

Sweden vs. Argentina

Final

Australia vs. Sweden

Relegation play-offs
The first-round losers played in the Relegation Play-offs. The winners of the play-offs advanced to the 1984 Davis Cup World Group, and the losers were relegated to their respective Zonal Regions.

Results summary
Date: 30 September–2 October

Czechoslovakia vs. Soviet Union

Great Britain vs. Chile

Denmark vs. Indonesia

Ireland vs. United States

References

External links
Davis Cup official website

World Group
Davis Cup World Group
Davis Cup